Benson Leung is an engineer known for reviewing USB-C cables for safety and specification compliance. His reviews have cast light on the proliferation of cheap, non-compliant cables.

Biography 

Leung is a senior software engineer at Google working on the ChromeOS kernel. He is an upstream Linux kernel maintainer for Chrome hardware.

USB cable reviews 
In 2016, Leung's laptop, a Chromebook Pixel, was rendered unbootable after plugging in a non-compliant but commercially available USB-C cable. Leung determined the cause to be a miswiring in the cable. Since then, Leung has reviewed USB-C cables on Amazon under the name "LaughingMan", to test for specification compliance and weed out unsafe cables. His tests have identified numerous problematic cables. Some cheap cables identified lack pull-up resistors mandated by the USB specification, potentially causing devices to draw high levels of current, causing irreversible damage to the machines they are plugged into. Leung found problematic cables can break the USB port they are plugged into, or even risk causing an electrical fire. Following Leung's work, some vendors fixed their designs, while Amazon banned the sale of non-compliant USB-C cables altogether. Supplementing his online reviews, Leung has published instructions to help end-users test their cables.

Leung is regarded as an expert on USB-C implementation.

References

External links 

 

Linux kernel programmers
Google employees
Living people
Year of birth missing (living people)